D.I.V.O.R.C.E may refer to:
 "D-I-V-O-R-C-E", a country song performed in 1968 by Tammy Wynette, and which was written as "D.I.V.O.R.C.E" on its record cover
 "D.I.V.O.R.C.E.", a 1975 Billy Connolly parody of the above song